Poundstone may refer to:

 Derek Poundstone, American professional strongman
 Paula Poundstone, American comedian
 William Poundstone, American author
 Freda Poundstone, Colorado politician and lobbyist, and drafter of the Poundstone Amendment
 Homer Poundstone, a US Navy Lieutenant Commander in the 1900s, see South Carolina-class battleship

See also